Susien Chong is an Australian fashion designer and a co-founder of the Sydney-based fashion label Lover.

Chong grew up in Sydney, attending St George Girls' High School, Kogarah. She obtained a degree in design from the University of Technology Sydney and came to prominence by winning the Smirnoff Fashion Award while still a student.

She interned for Australian label Zimmermann before founding Lover in 2001. She presented her debut solo show in 2004 at the Australian Fashion Week.

References

Year of birth missing (living people)
Living people
Australian fashion designers
Australian women company founders
Australian company founders
Australian women fashion designers